Juan César Alayo Vergara (born 18 November 1985) is a Peruvian football manager and former player who played as a left-back.

Playing career
Born Callao, Alayo started playing for Sport Boys. He spent the entirety of his career in his home country, representing Universidad San Marcos, La Peña Sporting, Universidad Técnica de Cajamarca, IDUNSA, León de Huánuco, Real Garcilaso, Franciscano San Román, Sport Áncash, Binacional, Unión Fuerza Minera and Juventud América de Cañete. He retired with the latter in 2015, aged 30.

Managerial career
Alayo started his managerial career in 2017 with Sport Boys' youth categories. On 9 May 2021, he was named interim manager of the first team after the departure of Teddy Cardama, and was in charge of the side for one match (a 0–2 loss against Alianza Lima) before returning to his previous role.

On 26 February 2022, Alayo was again named interim manager of Sport Boys, after Ytalo Manzo left the club. He returned to his assistant role after the appointment of Walter Fiori, but was again named interim on 11 April after Fiori left.

On 3 May 2022, Alayo was appointed manager of Sport Boys on a permanent basis.

References

External links

1985 births
Living people
People from Callao
Peruvian footballers
Association football defenders
Peruvian Primera División players
Sport Boys footballers
Deportivo Universidad San Marcos footballers
Universidad Técnica de Cajamarca footballers
Cusco FC footballers
León de Huánuco footballers
Sport Áncash footballers
Deportivo Binacional FC players
Peruvian football managers
Peruvian Primera División managers
Sport Boys managers